A good guy clause, typically found in rental agreements in New York City, is a provision that allows a tenant to be released from the liability of completing the agreed upon rental period, assuming the tenant vacates the rented space and leaves it in favorable condition.

History
Many landlords would rent office space to small companies or start-ups. If those companies got into financial trouble, they would fail to make payments on the property but refuse to give up the space, forcing the property owners to go through the process of eviction. This led to the demand, and creation of the Good Guy Clause.

Description
The use of a Good Guy Clause allows a renter to be released from liability of the lease if a rental is terminated early, giving tenants less apprehension regarding signing a time bound lease, and satisfying the landlord's worries about reclaiming their space "in the same condition in which they would have been had the lease expired in accordance with its terms (e.g., vacant, broom clean and with all amounts due and owing by tenant paid up to the date of expiration, etc.)".

References

.

Real property law
Contract clauses